Year 1025 (MXXV) was a common year starting on Friday (link will display the full calendar) of the Julian calendar.

Events 
 By place 

 Byzantine Empire 
 December 15 – Byzantine Emperor Basil II ("Bulgar Slayer") dies in Constantinople after a 50-year reign. Never married, he is succeeded by his brother and co-emperor Constantine VIII, who becomes sole ruler of the Byzantine Empire. Constantine calls the Sicilian invasion off. Catapan Basil Boioannes diverts the Byzantine expeditionary force already assembled on Calabria, to join the siege of Capua.

 Europe 
 April 18 – Bolesław I the Brave is crowned in Gniezno as the first king of Poland. He takes advantage of the interregnum in Germany (see 1024) and receives permission for his coronation from Pope John XIX; however, he dies on June 17.
 September – At the urging of Queen Constance of Arles, the three sons of King Robert II of France ("the Pious") revolt against their father – Hugh Magnus (heir and co-king), Henry I and Robert I, Duke of Burgundy start a civil war over power.
 December 25 – Mieszko II Lambert, son of Bolosław I, is crowned as king of Poland by archbishop Hippolytus in Gniezno Cathedral.

 Africa 
 Emir Al-Mu'izz ibn Badis of the Zirid dynasty in Ifriqiya (modern Tunisia) attempts to retake Sicily but fails.

 Asia 
 January 21 – Chifuru, daughter of powerful Japanese court official Fujiwara no Sanesuke (rival of Fujiwara no Michinaga) has her mogi ceremony. Sanesuke wants to make his daughter an imperial consort which causes the dislike of Empress Ishi (daughter of Michinaga) – eventually Kampaku (Regent) Fujiwara no Yorimichi prevents it.
 Srivijaya, a Buddhist kingdom based in Sumatra, is attacked by Emperor Rajendra I of the Chola dynasty of southern India in a dispute over trading rights in Southeast Asia. It survives, but declines in importance.
 Completion and publishing of Avicenna's Canon of Medicine.
 Japanese Kampaku (Regent) Fujiwara no Yorimichi holds horse racing at his mansion; the emperor attends.

Births 
 August 28 – Go-Reizei, Japanese emperor (d. 1068)
 Agnes of Poitou, Holy Roman Empress (d. 1077)
 Anna Dalassene, Byzantine empress and regent
 Edith of Wessex, English queen (approximate date)
 Elisaveta Yaroslavna of Kiev, Norwegian queen
 Gerald of Sauve-Majeure, French abbot (d. 1095)
 Gertrude of Poland, Grand Princess of Kiev (d. 1108)
 John Italus, Byzantine philosopher (d. 1090)
 John of Lodi, Italian hermit and bishop (d. 1106)
 Lothair Udo II, German margrave (d. 1082)
 Nong Zhigao, Vietnamese chieftain of Nong
 Ruben I, Armenian prince (approximate date)
 Rudolf of Rheinfelden, duke of Swabia (d. 1080)
 Simon I, French nobleman (approximate date)
 Tora Torbergsdatter, Norwegian Viking queen
 William VIII, French nobleman (approximate date)

Deaths 
 April 25 – Fujiwara no Seishi, Japanese empress consort (b. 972)
 May – Musharrif al-Dawla, Buyid emir of Iraq (b. 1003)
 June 17 – Bolesław I the Brave, king of Poland (b. 967)
 August 10 – Burchard of Worms, German bishop and writer
 August 11 – Kanshi, Japanese princess consort
 c. August 30 – Fujiwara no Kishi, Japanese crown princess, posthumously named empress, mother of Emperor Go-Reizei (b. 1007)
 September 17 – Hugh Magnus, king of France (b. 1007)
 September 29 – Louis I, count of Chiny and Verdun
 November
 Koshikibu no Naishi, Japanese waka poet and lady-in-waiting (b. c.999)
 Matilda, countess palatine of Lotharingia (b. 979)
 December 15 – Basil II, Byzantine emperor (b. 958)
 December 22 – Wang Qinruo, Chinese chancellor
 December – Eustathius of Constantinople, Byzantine patriarch
 Al-Qadi Abd al-Jabbar ibn Ahmad, Muslim theologian (b. 935)
 Mhic Mac Comhaltan Ua Cleirigh, Irish king
 Sabur ibn Ardashir, Persian statesman (b. 942)
 Watanabe no Tsuna, Japanese samurai (b. 953)

References